The Wall Street Historic District in Norwalk, Connecticut is a historic district that was listed on the National Register of Historic Places in 2009. The area encompasses the commercial and civic center of the Central Norwalk neighborhood, and includes 42 buildings, most of which are on the south side of Wall Street.  Among the buildings included is an 1860 Gothic Revival church at the corner of Wall and Mott Streets.

See also
National Register of Historic Places listings in Fairfield County, Connecticut

References

National Register of Historic Places in Fairfield County, Connecticut
Geography of Norwalk, Connecticut
Historic districts in Fairfield County, Connecticut
Historic districts on the National Register of Historic Places in Connecticut